Bracken Woods, owned and operated by the Cincinnati Park Board, is a city park in the neighborhood of Westwood in Cincinnati, Ohio established in 1975.

References

Parks in Cincinnati
Westwood, Cincinnati